Gyula Gyenes (20 February 1911 – 26 June 1988) was a Hungarian sprinter. He competed in the men's 100 metres at the 1936 Summer Olympics.

References

1911 births
1988 deaths
Athletes (track and field) at the 1936 Summer Olympics
Hungarian male sprinters
Olympic athletes of Hungary
Athletes from Budapest